Enver Halilović is a former ambassador of Bosnia and Herzegovina to the Russian Federation.

See also 
 Embassy of Bosnia and Herzegovina in Moscow

References 

Year of birth missing (living people)
Living people
Ambassadors of Bosnia and Herzegovina to Russia